Azorhizophilus is a genus from the family of Pseudomonadaceae, with one known species (Azorhizophilus paspali).

References

Further reading 
 

 

Pseudomonadales
Monotypic bacteria genera
Bacteria genera